The Night Express was an American named train of the Baltimore and Ohio Railroad (B&O) on its route between Detroit, Michigan, and Louisville, Kentucky, with major station stops in Toledo, Ohio, and Cincinnati. The service was numbered Train 57 southbound and Train 58 northbound.  The numbers 57/58 operated on the Detroit - Cincinnati line as early as 1921. The service was provided in conjunction with the Pere Marquette Railroad (and later, the Chesapeake and Ohio Railway) from Detroit to Toledo and with the Louisville and Nashville from Cincinnati to Louisville with connections to New Orleans.

The train went unnamed until 1960 when the B&O gave the name Night Express to the 57/58 Detroit-Louisville itinerary. By 1963, the southern terminus of the train route was shortened to Cincinnati's Union Terminal.

The Night Express had its Detroit beginning point in the New York Central's Michigan Central Station in Detroit 1963, when the B&O and the C&O merged and the B&O moved it to the Fort Street Union Depot in Detroit.

With the September 1967 schedule, the B&O dropped the train from service.

Stations

Schedule and equipment

In 1947, southbound Night Express Train # 57 operated on the following schedule (departure times at principal stops shown):

In the 1940s, the southbound Night Express consisted of two or three head-end cars, an RPO baggage car, 12 sleepers. Between Cincinnati and Louisville there was a dining-lounge car.

References

Passenger trains of the Baltimore and Ohio Railroad
Named passenger trains of the United States
Night trains of the United States
Passenger rail transportation in Kentucky
Passenger rail transportation in Michigan
Passenger rail transportation in Ohio
Railway services discontinued in 1967